"Tsunami" is a song by Welsh rock band Manic Street Preachers, released as a single on 5 July 1999 through Epic Records. It was the fourth and final single released from their fifth studio album, This Is My Truth Tell Me Yours (1998). All three members of the band—James Dean Bradfield, Sean Moore and Nicky Wire—share the writing credits. The single peaked at number 11 on the UK Singles Chart.

Background
"Tsunami" is the Japanese word for "big wave". The song was inspired by The Silent Twins, June and Jennifer Gibbons, who gave up speaking when they were young, became involved in crime and ended up being sent to Broadmoor Hospital. The song is unique in the band's catalogue in that it is largely built around an electric sitar and strings.

Release
The single peaked at number 11 in the United Kingdom, remaining on the UK Singles Chart for eight weeks. Of all four singles from This Is My Truth Tell Me Yours, "Tsunami" spent the fewest weeks on the chart. In Finland, the song peaked in number 13, spending three weeks on Finnish Singles Chart.

The B-side "Buildings for Dead People" appears on the enhanced CD 1 along with the video for "A Design for Life". CD 2 includes a remix of "Tsunami" by Cornelius and a mix by Electron Ray Tube. The cassette version includes a live recording of "Motown Junk" from the Tivoli in Utrecht in Holland on 29 March 1999. "Tsunami" was also included on the band's Forever Delayed singles compilation.

Track listing
All music was composed by James Dean Bradfield and Sean Moore except where indicated. All were lyrics written by Nick Jones except where indicated.

UK CD1
 "Tsunami" – 3:50
 "Buildings for Dead People" – 5:29
 "A Design for Life" (video version) – 4:20

UK CD2
 "Tsunami" – 3:50
 "Tsunami" (Cornelius remix) – 4:04
 "Tsunami" (Electron Ray Tube mix) – 6:43

UK cassette single
 "Tsunami" – 3:50
 "Motown Junk (Medley)" (live at the Tivoli in Utrecht, Netherlands, on 29 March 1999) (lyrics: Richey James, Jones) – 4:02

Charts

References

External links
 Article on "The Silent Twins" from the New Yorker

1999 singles
1999 songs
Epic Records singles
Manic Street Preachers songs
Songs about floods
Songs based on actual events
Song recordings produced by Mike Hedges
Songs written by James Dean Bradfield
Songs written by Nicky Wire
Songs written by Sean Moore (musician)